The Vice-Prime Minister of Mauritius is an honorary title usually carried by up to two incumbent Ministers of the Government of Mauritius, that does not exist separately under the Constitution of Mauritius.

There is currently two Vice-Prime Minister of Mauritius, namely Leela Devi Dookun and Mohammad Anwar Husnoo. They became Vice-Prime Minister on 12 November 2019

Overview
In 2005, Dr. Navin Ramgoolam who was then the Prime Minister proposed a motion at the National Assembly to create offices for two Vice Prime Ministers. As the Constitution already provides an office of Deputy Prime Minister, the National Assembly voted against the bill. However they recognised that two cabinet ministers, who are important in hierarchy but are still not as powerful as the Deputy Prime Minister, shall be officially known as Vice-Prime Minister (VPM). As no specific office was created the VPM position is essentially an honorific title. Therefore, in case of absence, illness or sudden death of the Prime Minister, it is only the Deputy Prime Minister who takes on the role and responsibilities of Acting Prime Minister until the Prime Minister resumes office or another is appointed.

List of vice prime ministers

See also

 President of Mauritius
 Prime Minister of Mauritius
 Deputy Prime Minister of Mauritius
 Leader of the Opposition (Mauritius)
 Government of Mauritius

References

 
Lists of political office-holders in Mauritius